Muckle Holm is a small island in Shetland. It is in Yell Sound, near the Northmavine.

There is a lighthouse, first lit in 1976.

See also

 List of lighthouses in Scotland
 List of Northern Lighthouse Board lighthouses

References

External links
 Northern Lighthouse Board 
 Close-up of Muckle Holm Lighthouse

Uninhabited islands of Shetland
Lighthouses in Shetland